, also romanized as Kyū-an, was a  after Ten'yō and before Ninpei. This period spanned the years from July 1145 through January 1151.

Change of Era
 January 25, 1145 : The new era name was created because a comet was sighted in the sky in the 7th month of Ten'yō gannen. One era ended and a new one commenced in Ten'yō 1, on the 22nd day of the 7th month of 1145.

Events
 1145 (Kyūan 1, 8th month): The mother of former-Emperor Sutoku, Taiken-mon In, died.
 1146 (Kyūan 2, 2nd month), Emperor Konoe visited Emperor Toba-no-Hōō.
 1146 (Kyūan 2, 12th month), Konoe joined in a celebration honoring Sesshō Fujiwara no Tadamichi (the regent) on his 58th birthday.
 1148 (Kyūan 4, 6th month, 26th day): The imperial palace was consumed by flames.
 1150 (Kyūan 6, 1st month): Konoe assumed the role of a mature adult; and he married Fujiwara-no Tokoku, who had been raised by sadaijin Fujiwara-no Yorinaga. Tokoku was the daughter of dainagon Taira-no Kiyomori. This bride became kōgū (first empress).
 1150 (Kyūan 6, 3rd month): Konoe married again, this time to a daughter raised by Sesshō Fujiwara-no Tadamichi. She was the daughter of Dainagon Fujiwara-no Koremichi. This bride became chūgyo (second empress). Konoe was so very much enamoured of this second wife that he neglected his first wife, which caused discord in the kugyō, especially between Tadamichi and Yorinaga.
 1150 (Kyūan 6, 12th month): Sesshō Minamoto-no Tadamichi, resigns his position and is named daijō daijin. In this same month, Minamoto-no Yoshikane became head of the Ashikaga clan in Shimotsuke Province.

Notes

References
 Brown, Delmer M. and Ichirō Ishida, eds. (1979).  Gukanshō: The Future and the Past. Berkeley: University of California Press. ;  OCLC 251325323
 Nussbaum, Louis-Frédéric and Käthe Roth. (2005).  Japan encyclopedia. Cambridge: Harvard University Press. ;  OCLC 58053128
 Titsingh, Isaac. (1834). Nihon Odai Ichiran; ou,  Annales des empereurs du Japon.  Paris: Royal Asiatic Society, Oriental Translation Fund of Great Britain and Ireland. OCLC 5850691
 Varley, H. Paul. (1980). A Chronicle of Gods and Sovereigns: Jinnō Shōtōki of Kitabatake Chikafusa. New York: Columbia University Press. ;  OCLC 6042764

External links 
 National Diet Library, "The Japanese Calendar" -- historical overview plus illustrative images from library's collection

Japanese eras